Marta Kaczmarek is a Polish-Australian theatre, television and film actress.

Early life
Kaczmarek was born in Krasnystaw, Poland, and trained at the Ludwik Solski Academy for the Dramatic Arts in Krakow. She moved to Perth, Western Australia, with her husband and daughter in the 1980s before moving to Melbourne in 2007.

Career
After a career in theatre, Kaczmarek's first Australian film role was opposite Geoffrey Rush in Shine.

Kaczmarek has had guest roles in numerous Australian television series as well as recurring roles in Wild Kat, Offspring, Rake and Wentworth.

Between 2007 and 2010, she played the lead role of Ellie Zdybicka in the SBS drama The Circuit alongside Gary Sweet and Aaron Pedersen.

Personal life
Kaczmarek arrived in Perth in the 1980s and worked as a dancer, waitress, real estate agent, actor, director and lecturer at the Western Australian Academy of Performing Arts. Her book of poems, Ziemia Przybrana (Adopted Earth), was published in 2004.

Following her daughter Kasia Kaczmarek, Marta moved to Melbourne in 2007, directing community projects in Glenroy and Albion as well as a production for the 2010 Melbourne International Comedy Festival.

In 2004, Kaczmarek was awarded a Cavalier's Cross of the Order of Merit of the Republic of Poland by the Polish government for her longstanding efforts in the cultivation of Polish culture in Australia.

Awards
 Equity Ensemble Award for cast of Rake, 2015
 Green Room Award for Best Female Performer for her performance of Masha in the theatre adaptation of Arnold Zable's Cafe Scheherazade, 2011.

Filmography

References

External links
 

1955 births
Living people
Polish emigrants to Australia
Australian film actresses
Australian stage actresses
Australian television actresses
20th-century Australian actresses
21st-century Australian actresses
People from Krasnystaw